Evolution (French: Évolution) is a 1971 Canadian animated short by Michael Mills, offering a humorous portrayal of evolution. It won Best Animated Film at the 23rd Canadian Film Awards and was nominated for the Academy Award for Best Animated Short Film at the 44th Academy Awards. 

A film without words, Evolution was animated, directed and produced by Mills during his tenure at the National Film Board of Canada, which began in 1966 and lasted until he formed his own animation company, Michael Mills Productions, in 1974.

Summary
The film begins with a single cell organisms in the oceans, followed by the first creatures to emerge into land, up until the dawn of modern man.

Credits
 Story, Design, & Animation: Michael Mills
 Assistant Animator: Gayle Thomas
 Animation Camera: Kjeld Nielsen
 Optical Camera: Ron Moore
 Music: Doug Randle
 Sound Editing: Peter Hearn
 Re-Recording: Roger Lamoureux
 Director & Producer: Michael Mills
 Executive Producer: Robert Verrall

See also
History of the World in Three Minutes Flat-the 1980 animated short also directed by Mills
1971 in film

References

External links
Watch Evolution at NFB.ca
Evolution on NFB's official YouTube channel

1971 films
National Film Board of Canada animated short films
Animated films without speech
Quebec films
Films about evolution
1970s animated short films
1971 animated films
Best Animated Short Film Genie and Canadian Screen Award winners
1970s Canadian films